"Heaven or Las Vegas" is a song by Scottish band Cocteau Twins. It was released by Capitol Records in October 1990 as the second single from the Heaven or Las Vegas album. The song has been described as dream pop.

In the United States, the song reached No. 9 on Billboard's Alternative Songs chart in 1991. The track has been recognized as one of the greatest accomplishments in the genre of dream pop as well as one of the Cocteau Twins' most signature songs.

Composition 
Cocteau Twins guitarist Robin Guthrie used four electric guitars during the recording of "Heaven or Las Vegas", including a 1959 Jazzmaster, a 1959 Stratocaster, a PRS guitar and a modified Levinson Blade JM during the track's slide guitar solo, which has been said to have "encapsulated the band’s staggering confidence in arrangements and execution." Bassist Simon Raymonde referred to Guthrie as a "mix king" and a "sonic master" for his work on the track. 

The song is built off a "simplistic" D-G-Cadd9 chord progression, which is ventured from during Guthrie's "soaring overdriven slide part." It contains "sparkling arpeggios" that emanate a "heavenly" aura, as its title would suggest. 

Popdust noted how the title juxtaposes "two places that really couldn't be any more different from each other."

Commercial performance

The track entered the US Billboard Alternative Songs chart in late November 1990, reaching a peak of No. 9 on the chart dated for the week of January 12, 1991. It was the third of three consecutive top ten hits on the chart for Cocteau Twins, and it would be their last single to earn a placement on the chart.

The song did not chart in the band's native United Kingdom, unlike the album's lead single, "Iceblink Luck", which reached No. 38 in 1990.

Legacy 
Paste declared "Heaven or Las Vegas" as "the album’s literal and figurative centerpiece (and perhaps dream pop’s all-time pinnacle)", praising Fraser's vocal performance "atop guitars that gleam like diamonds, pianos that drip like water and a hefty whisper of a drum shuffle." 

Vice's James Greig described the song as "extremely accessible and probably the best place to start if you’re a complete novice to the band."

The Guardian listed the song as one of the band's ten best, calling it "a lovely distillation of the Cocteaus’ knack for a slower but soaring singalong in the newer style, especially on the choruses and the conclusion." 

Canadian R&B singer The Weeknd named a song "Heaven or Las Vegas" on his Thursday mixtape, after previously sampling Cocteau Twins' "Cherry-Coloured Funk" on his song "The Knowing" from the House of Balloons mixtape. The Weeknd has said that "Cocteau Twins play such a huge role in my sound."

In 2020, the song gained a resurgence in popularity thanks to the social media platform TikTok, as users use the song to soundtrack beauty tutorials or attempts to decipher Fraser's lyrics.

Track listing 
All tracks written by Cocteau Twins.
 "Heaven or Las Vegas" (edit) – 3:59
 "Dials" – 2:41
 "Heaven or Las Vegas" (album version) – 4:54

Personnel 
 Robin Guthrie
 Elizabeth Fraser
 Simon Raymonde

Charts

References

External links 

 Cocteau Twins.com discography

1990 singles
Cocteau Twins songs
4AD singles
1990 songs